Pascal Collasse (or Colasse) (22 January 1649 (baptised) – 17 July 1709) was a French composer of the Baroque era. Born in Rheims, Collasse became a disciple of Jean-Baptiste Lully during the latter's domination of the French operatic stage. When Lully died in 1687 leaving his tragédie en musique Achille et Polyxène unfinished, Collasse completed the last four acts of the score. He went on to produce around a dozen operas and ballets, as well as sacred music, including settings of the Cantiques spirituels of Jean Racine. His plan to establish his own opera house in Lille ended in failure when the theatre burnt down. He dabbled in alchemy with even less success. His musical style is close to that of Lully.

Works
 Achille et Polyxène, tragédie lyrique, (overture and first act by Jean-Baptiste Lully) 1687
 Thétis et Pélée, tragédie lyrique, 1689
 Énée et Lavinie, tragédie lyrique, 1690
 Astrée, tragédie lyrique, 1691
 Le Ballet de Villeneuve-Saint-Georges, ballet, 1692
 Les saisons, opéra-ballet, 1695
 La naissance de Vénus, 1696
 Jason ou La toison d’or, tragédie lyrique, 1696
 Canente, tragédie lyrique, 1700
 Polyxène et Pirrhus, tragédie lyrique, 1706

Sources
The Viking Opera Guide

External links
Le magazine de l'opéra baroque by Jean-Claude Brenac (in French)

 Musical Manuscripts Collection at the Harry Ransom Center

1649 births
1709 deaths
French Baroque composers
French male classical composers
French opera composers
French ballet composers
Male opera composers
Musicians from Reims
17th-century male musicians